Župa (Serbian Cyrillic: Жупа) is a village in the Split-Dalmatia County, Croatia located in the Zagvozd municipality. In 2011 it was populated by 53 inhabitants.

References 

Zupa, Split-Dalmatia County
Zupa, Split-Dalmatia County